Koksilah Ridge (Hwsalu'utsum) is an elevated area located south of the Cowichan Valley on Vancouver Island, British Columbia. It is visible in most of the Cowichan Valley and on the Saanich Peninsula north of Brentwood Bay. As seen from North Saanich or Sidney, it is plough-shaped, with long gentle slopes.

From north to south, the bedrock lithology begins with Cretaceous-era sedimentary rock, chiefly shale, sandstone and conglomerate. Above them lies a pluton of Jurassic-age granodiorite, which underlies the summit. Around the eastern, southern and western edges of this pluton is a complex association of Pennsylvanian-era argillite, greywacke, chert and diabase.

The soils of Koksilah Ridge are well or rapidly drained gravelly sandy loams and gravelly loamy sands with podzol profile development. They support Coastal Western Hemlock-type forests in which Douglas-fir and western hemlock are most common at lower elevations. These forests are classified under the provincial Biogeoclimactic Ecosystem Classification as Coastal Western Hemlock, Very Dry Maritime Subzone (CWHxm2). Areas above  are mapped as Coastal Western Hemlock, Moist Maritime Subzone (CWHmm2), with abundant Douglas-fir, amabilis fir, and western hemlock.

The forest industry has been active on Koksilah Ridge for many years and the native forest is interrupted by logged-off areas of varying size. These clear cuts are prominent when a snow cover is present. Snow may lie on the higher parts for up to six months over a severe winter, but is seen on only a few days through a mild winter. Island Timberlands presently has tenure.

References

Further reading

Muller, J.E. (1980). Geology Victoria Map 1553A. Ottawa: Geological Survey of Canada.
Jungen, J.R. (1985). Soils of Southern Vancouver Island. Victoria: Ministry of Environment Technical Report 17

Southern Vancouver Island
Vancouver Island Ranges